Beneficence may refer to:
 Beneficence (hip-hop artist)
 Beneficence, a synonym for philanthropy
 Beneficence (ethics), a concept in medical ethics
 Beneficence (statue), a statue at Ball State University
 Procreative beneficence
 Order of Beneficence (Greece)